Sujiko is a logic-based, combinatorial number-placement puzzle created by Jai Gomer of Kobayaashi Studios.

The puzzle takes place on a 3x3 grid with four circled number clues at the centre of each quadrant which indicate the sum of the four numbers in that quadrant. The numbers 1-9 must be placed in the grid, in accordance with the circled clues, to complete the puzzle.

Sujiko is featured in UK newspapers including The Times, The Telegraph, and The Sun.

References 

Logic puzzles
2010 introductions